Dumaresq may refer to:

Locations
Armidale Dumaresq Shire, a former local government area in north-eastern New South Wales
Dumaresq, New South Wales, an old stop on a New South Wales railway line
Dumaresq Creek, running through Armidale in Armidale Dumaresq Shire
Dumaresq Lake, a lake in Nova Scotia, Canada
Dumaresq River, an Australian river that forms part of the border between New South Wales and Queensland

People
Dumaresq (surname)

Technology
Dumaresq, an analogue computer designed in 1902 to assist in warship gunnery